The Royal Society of Ulster Architects (RSUA) is the professional body for registered architects in Northern Ireland. It was founded in 1901. Chartered Royal Institute of British Architects (RIBA) members in Northern Ireland are automatically members of the RSUA. RSUA members use the suffix "RSUA" and may also use "RIBA". According to its website it has "over 1000 members".

Organisation and activities
The supreme governing body of the society is its council, which chaired by the president of the RSUA. The society members are entitled to nominate fellow members to the council and to vote in elections.

The society operates a bookshop at 2 Mount Charles in Belfast. This bookshop is the Northern Ireland regional branch of the RIBA bookshop.

It is involved in architectural education and awards scholarships to Northern Ireland-based students of architecture. The society also awards the annual RSUA Silver Medal and RSUA Bronze Medal, which are similar to the RIBA President's Medals Students Awards.

PLACE

PLACE Architecture & Built Environment Centre was a part of the RSUA from 2004 until 2019. It was formed in 2004 by the society in partnership with Belfast City Council and the Arts Council of Northern Ireland. It closed in August 2019.

Perspective magazine
The society issues a journal, Perspective, on a bi-monthly basis. In effect this publication is not so much a journal as it is a magazine; It features reviews of recently completed buildings in Northern Ireland, together with book reviews and local arts updates. The magazine is based in Belfast. Its content is controlled by an editorial committee dominated by members of the RSUA Council, the central governing body of the society. It has been published by the Ulster Tatler Group since 2001.

RSUA Design Awards
The RSUA Design Awards, which are architectural, artistic and cultural awards, are given annually to recognise the work of architects in Northern Ireland. The awards mainly focus on architecture, and are separate from the RIBA Awards. Primary among these awards is the Liam MacCormick Prize, awarded to the building judged to be best overall in the relevant year. The RSUA awards are adjudicated by a panel of independent judges, including experts from outside Northern Ireland; For example Dublin City Architect Jim Barrett held the chair in 2006.

References

External links

Organisations based in Northern Ireland
Architecture in Northern Ireland
Ulster Architects
Architecture organisations based in the United Kingdom
Architecture-related professional associations
1901 establishments in Ireland
Organisations based in Northern Ireland with royal patronage